Sweet Substitute, retitled Caressed in the United States, is a Canadian drama film, directed by Larry Kent and released in 1964.

The film centres on Tom (Bob Howay), a high school student whose efforts to secure an academic scholarship to university are complicated by his sexual compulsions.  He is caught in a love triangle between Elaine (Angela Gann), a prim and proper girl who is saving herself for marriage, and Kathy (Carol Pastinsky), a more sexually available girl whom Tom impregnates.

It was a Canadian Film Award nominee for Best Picture at the 17th Canadian Film Awards in 1965, but did not win.

It was part of a retrospective screening of Kent's films, alongside The Bitter Ash, When Tomorrow Dies and High, which screened at a number of venues in 2002 and 2003, including Cinematheque Ontario in Toronto, the Pacific Cinémathèque in Vancouver and the Canadian Film Institute in Ottawa.

References

External links
 

1964 films
1964 drama films
Canadian drama films
English-language Canadian films
Films directed by Larry Kent
1960s English-language films
1960s Canadian films